Dog Eared Dream is a studio album by American guitarist Willy Porter released in 1994

Release and reception
The album was released in 1994, and then rereleased in 1995 by Private Music Records. The song that received the most attention was called, Angry Words. Porter toured nationally to support the album, opening for The Cranberries and Toad the Wet Sprocket. The album was critically acclaimed and referred to as his "breakout" album. The album launched Porter's career and introduced the world to his music which was rooted in acoustic guitar. The songs which received airplay on the radio were: Angry Words, Rita, Jesus on the Grille, and Flying.

Track listing

Personnel
Willy Porter band
 Willy Porter – guitar, Rhythm guitar, vocals
 Steve Kleiber, (bass guitar).
 John Calarco - drums

References

1994 albums
Six Degrees Records albums
Private Music artists